Loose Walk is a 1972 album by Count Basie and Roy Eldridge.

Reception
Scott Yanow, writing for AllMusic, said that "[i]ronically, the earliest recording by Count Basie for Norman Granz's Pablo label was one of the most recent to be released." He called it "a set of jammable standards", yielding "quite fun" results.

Nat Hentoff, in his book Listen to the Stories: Nat Hentoff on Jazz and Country Music, wrote that "Elridge is intimately lyrical on I Surrender Dear and sounds like a whip on other tracks." On Basie's playing, he wrote that he "is moved...to break out into some robust stride piano that hadn't been heard from him in years."

Track listing
 "In a Mellow Tone" (Duke Ellington, Milt Gabler) – 6:45
 "Loose Walk" (Sonny Stitt) – 7:20
 "Makin' Whoopee" (Walter Donaldson, Gus Kahn) – 4:37
 "If I Had You" (Jimmy Campbell, Reginald Connelly, Ted Shapiro) – 3:50
 "I Surrender Dear" (Harry Barris, Gordon Clifford) – 5:25
 "5400 North" (Roy Eldridge) – 6:50

Personnel
Count Basie – piano
Roy Eldridge – trumpet
Eddie "Lockjaw" Davis – tenor saxophone
Freddie Green – guitar
Al Grey – trombone
Harold Jones – drums
Norman Keenan – double bass

References

1972 albums
Count Basie albums
Roy Eldridge albums
Pablo Records albums